Peter Francisco (born 14 February 1962 in Cape Town, Western Cape) is a former South African professional snooker player who won the African Snooker Championship 4 times and South African Snooker Championship 8 times and the South African  Billiards Championship 13 times as an amateur and professional.

Career
Francisco turned professional in 1984, and reached the final stages of the World Snooker Championship on five occasions: 1988, 1989, 1990, 1992 and 1995. He reached the semifinals in two ranking events: the 1986 International Open and the 1987 Grand Prix.

In June 2013 he won the ABSF African Snooker Championship.

Francisco participated in the 2015 Six-red World Championship, playing five matches in his group. He lost 1–5 to Marco Fu and Jamie Clarke, 3–5 to Mark Williams and 4–5 to eventual champion Thepchaiya  and was eliminated after the group stage, but defeated Darren Paris 5–1 to record his first competitive victory since a 10–8 win over Mick Price in the 1995 World Championship.

Controversy
In 1995 Francisco lost 10–2 in the first round of the World Snooker Championship against Jimmy White. There were an unusual number of bets made that the scoreline would be 10–2 in favour of White, which was the eventual outcome. Betting had been suspended on the match against the South African shortly before it began and a World Snooker Association panel analysed the match and later banned Francisco for five years for not conducting himself in a manner consistent with his status as a professional sportsman. At the same hearing he was not found guilty of match rigging. After the 5 years of his ban was up he did briefly resume his pro career in 2000 but failed to make any impact.

Personal life
He is the nephew of fellow snooker players Manuel and Silvino Francisco.

Performance and rankings timeline

Career finals

Amateur finals: 10 (10 titles)

References

1962 births
South African snooker players
South African people of Hispanic descent
Living people
Sportspeople from Cape Town
Competitors at the 2013 World Games